Waga is a town in Sri Lanka.

Waga may also refer to:

Places 
 Waga District, Iwate, Japan
 Waga River, in Iwate Prefecture

People 
 Antoni Waga (1799–1890), Polish naturalist
 Jakub Ignacy Waga (1800–1872), Polish botanist

Broadcasting 
 WAGA-TV, a television station in Atlanta, Georgia, USA
 WVEE, a radio station in Atlanta, Georgia, formerly WAGA-FM from 1948 to 1959 
 WDWD, a radio station in Atlanta, Georgia, formerly WAGA from 1937 to 1959

Other uses 
 Waga sculpture, a type of Ethiopian memorial carving
 Wakawaka language, or Waga, an extinct language of Queensland, Australia
 Viliame Waqaseduadua (born 1983), New Zealand rugby union player known as Waga
 Waga coat of arms, a Polish coat of arms